Viens is a surname. Notable people with the surname include:

Claude Viens (born 1949), Canadian handball player
Évelyne Viens (born 1997), Canadian soccer player
Mario Viens (born 1955), Canadian ice hockey player
 Anne Viens, fictional character in television series La Job